Professional Tool & Equipment News (PTEN)  is a tool and equipment magazine for automotive repair technicians, shop owners, repair shop managers, mechanics, shop foreman and estimators.

Overview
PTEN was started in 1990. The magazine was started as a bimonthly publication and was established by Rudy Wolf. The catalog-style magazine covers new tools and equipment in auto repair through new product releases, tool reviews and literature guides. PTEN is issued 10 times per year. The magazine is part of Endeavor Business Media. The headquarters of the magazine is in Fort Atkinson, Wisconsin.

The magazine has an audited circulation of approximately 105,000 automotive aftermarket repair professionals.

References

External links
 Official website

Automobile magazines published in the United States
Bimonthly magazines published in the United States
Business magazines published in the United States
Magazines established in 1990
Magazines published in Wisconsin
Professional and trade magazines